This is a list of bays in the United States.

See also :Category:Bays of the United States

Alabama
Bon Secour Bay
Mobile Bay
Perdido Bay

Alaska

Bristol Bay
Bucareli Bay
Disenchantment Bay
Eschscholtz Bay
Funter Bay
Glacier Bay
Goodhope Bay
Hazen Bay
Holtz Bay
Kachemak Bay
Kamishak Bay
Kuskokwim Bay
Kvichak Bay
LeConte Bay
Lituya Bay
Massacre Bay
Naukati Bay
Nushagak Bay
Orca Bay
Pavlof Bay
Peard Bay
Petrof Bay
Resurrection Bay
Sarana Bay
Thomas Bay
Ugashik Bay
Unimak Bay
Yakutat Bay

California
Alamitos Bay
Bodega Bay
Bolinas Bay
Drakes Bay
Estero Bay
Grizzly Bay
Half Moon Bay
Humboldt Bay
Monterey Bay
Morro Bay
Richardson Bay
San Diego Bay
San Francisco Bay
San Leandro Bay
San Pablo Bay
San Rafael Bay
Santa Monica Bay
South Bay
Suisun Bay
Tomales Bay

Delaware
Delaware Bay
Rehoboth Bay
Indian River Bay
Little Assawoman Bay
Assawoman Bay

Florida

Apalachicola Bay
Biscayne Bay
Choctawhatchee Bay
East Bay
Escambia Bay
Florida Bay
Palm Bay (Florida)
Pensacola Bay
Ponce de Leon Bay
San Carlos Bay
Sarasota Bay
St. Andrews Bay (Florida)
Tampa Bay
Whitewater Bay

Georgia
Grand Bay

Hawaii
Anaehoomalu Bay
Hanalei Bay
Hanauma Bay
Hilo Bay
Kāneʻohe Bay
Kaunaoa Bay
Kealakekua Bay
La'aloa Bay
Maunalua Bay
Ma‘alaea Bay

Louisiana
Kayden Baites Bay
Bay Chene Fleur
Vermilion Bay

Maine
Casco Bay
Chandler Bay
Cobscook Bay
Dennys Bay
Dyer Bay
Englishman Bay
Frenchman Bay
Gouldsboro Bay
Harrington Bay
Johnson Bay
Little Kennebec Bay
Little Machias Bay
Machias Bay
Merrymeeting Bay
Narraguagus Bay
Passamaquoddy Bay
Penobscot Bay
Pigeon Hill Bay
Saco Bay

Maryland
Assawoman Bay
Chesapeake Bay
Chincoteague Bay
Fishing Bay
Herring Bay
Isle of Wight Bay
Mallows Bay
Sinepuxent Bay

Massachusetts
Assonet Bay
Buttermilk Bay
Buzzards Bay
Cape Cod Bay
Duxbury Bay
Massachusetts Bay
Narragansett Bay
Plymouth Bay
Popponesset Bay
Quincy Bay
Waquoit Bay

Michigan

 Anchor Bay
 Ashmun Bay
 Au Train Bay
 Bete Grise Bay
 Big Bay de Noc
 Brest Bay
 East Moran Bay
 Good Harbor Bay
 Grand Traverse Bay
 Green Bay
 Hammond Bay
 Huron Bay
 Keweenaw Bay
 Little Bay de Noc
 Little Traverse Bay
 Misery Bay
 Oronto Bay
 Potagannissing Bay
 Saginaw Bay
 Sleeping Bear Bay
 Thunder Bay
 Torch Bay
 Whitefish Bay

Mississippi
Bay of Saint Louis
Biloxi Bay

Nevada 
Crystal Bay

New Hampshire 
Great Bay

New Jersey
Barnegat Bay
Delaware Bay
Great Bay
Manahawkin Bay
Newark Bay
Raritan Bay
Sandy Hook Bay
Upper New York Bay

New York
Gardiners Bay
Great South Bay
Jamaica Bay
Lower New York Bay
Patchogue Bay
Peconic Bay
Raritan Bay
South Oyster Bay
Upper New York Bay

North Carolina
Onslow Bay
Raleigh Bay
Long Bay

Ohio
Sandusky Bay
Maumee Bay
Put-In-Bay
Manila Bay

Oregon
Alsea Bay
Boiler Bay
Coos Bay
Depoe Bay
Nehalem Bay
Nestucca Bay
Netarts Bay
Tillamook Bay
Winchester Bay
Yaquina Bay
Youngs Bay

Pennsylvania
Presque Isle Bay

Rhode Island
Mount Hope Bay
Narragansett Bay
Greenwich Bay

South Carolina
Bulls Bay
Long Bay
Winyah Bay

Texas
Aransas Bay
Baffin Bay
Copano Bay
Corpus Christi Bay
East Matagorda Bay
Galveston Bay
Laguna Madre
Matagorda Bay
Nueces Bay
Oso Bay
San Antonio Bay
Trinity Bay

Virginia
Belmont Bay
Burtons Bay
Chincoteague Bay
Mobjack Bay
Chesapeake Bay
Cameron Bay

Washington

Bellingham Bay
Birch Bay
Boundary Bay
Commencement Bay
Elliott Bay
Liberty Bay
Massacre Bay
Padilla Bay
Portage Bay
Salmon Bay
Sequim Bay
Shilshole Bay
Skagit Bay
Semiahmoo Bay
Union Bay
Willapa Bay

Wisconsin
Chequamegon Bay
Detroit Harbor
Green Bay
Oronto Bay
Pokegama Bay
Sturgeon Bay
Superior Bay

United States
Bays